Timothy S. Gerritsen is a producer and designer who has been involved primarily in video games.

Career
Tim Gerritsen was the Business Development Manager at Human Head Studios. Gerritsen decided to license a tabletop role-playing game for his company's Rune computer  game (2000), which could then generate IP that could be used in later releases of the computer franchise. Gerritsen scouted out possible licensees in 1999 at Gen Con 32 and settled on Atlas Games as the best choice; he wanted a small company, who would give more attention to the design of the game, and he liked Atlas' connections with designers like Robin Laws, Jonathan Tweet, Greg Stolze, and John Scott Tynes. John Nephew of Atlas was originally skeptical about producing a licensed game but Atlas Creative Director Jeff Tidball convinced him to give it a try; Atlas then contracted Robin Laws to write the game, and the Rune role-playing game was published in 2001.

Gerritsen was later director of product development for Irrational Games.

References

External links
 

American game designers
Living people
Place of birth missing (living people)
Year of birth missing (living people)